The adjective superannuated may refer to 
 archaic, or old-fashioned
 related to a superannuation (pension), as used particularly in Great Britain, Australia, and New Zealand
 in the military, disqualified for active duty due to age 
 someone older than the typical member of a particular social group